The Farewell Spit Lighthouse is located at the end of New Zealand's longest sand spit in Golden Bay / Mohua, near the northern tip of the South Island. It guides vessels entering Cook Strait from the west and south. The LED rotating beacon flashes white or red, once every 15 seconds. Red is shown to warn approaching vessels of extensive shoaling. The tower is constructed of an open steel lattice to withstand abrasive sand and salt-laden winds.

History 
The drifting sand dunes of Farewell Spit are low lying and interspersed with fresh water lagoons, with an extensive shoal area on the southern side. 
The need for a lighthouse to warn mariners was identified in 1856, in the days of early European settlement, in response to a growing number of stranding and wrecks. In 1866, there were protests about government delays in establishing a lighthouse on Farewell Spit. Eventually, under the direction of James Balfour, Colonial Marine Engineer and Superintendent of Lighthouses, a design was prepared for a lighthouse to be built at Bush End Point, near the end of the sandspit. The first lighthouse was constructed on a wooden lattice tower in 1870. However, it was no match for the abrasive sand and salt-laden winds. Tenders were called in December 1894 for a replacement steel lattice tower, and a new lighthouse was commissioned in January 1897.  

The original oil-burning lamp was converted to a 1000-watt electric lamp in 1954, and the diesel power supply replaced by a buried mains electricity cable along the spit in 1966. The original lamp was changed to a modern rotating beacon with a 50-watt tungsten halogen bulb in 1999. In 2019, the lighthouse was converted to solar power, and the mains supply disconnected.

The spit was a barren and uninviting place to be a lighthouse keeper. Sand got into everything. The lighthouse sits on a low vegetated dune; an oasis surrounded by an ever-changing landscape, reshaped by incessant wind and tide. Early attempts at gardening were swamped during exceptional high tides, or plants were eaten by marauding weka.

Since being de-manned and automated in 1984, the keeper’s houses are used by the Department of Conservation and tour groups.

The keepers include:

 Alexander Greenlees McKinlay (2nd assistant, 1871–1872)
 James Nelson (c. 1870s)
 Robert Leighton (c. 1916)
 Hugh Jamieson (1946–1949)
In 2016, structural repairs were made to the tower and it was given a major repaint.  All materials for the work, including 10 storeys of scaffolding, paint, and the water required for blasting and surface preparation had to be transported along the sandspit to the site.

Access 
The lighthouse is located approximately  along the sand spit.  Farewell Spit / Onetahua is a wildlife sanctuary run by the Department of Conservation. The area is an important bird nesting area, especially for Australasian gannet. It is closed to casual visitors, and public access to the lighthouse site is restricted to people on an ecotour. The public is not permitted to climb the lighthouse structure.

Operations 
The lighthouse is operated by Maritime New Zealand. Its characteristic is either a white or red flash every fifteen seconds, depending on where you view it from. It is a sector light. The red flashes warn a vessel it is in a danger of hitting the shoal. The white sector shines from 113° to 299° and 333° to 110°; the red from 299° to 333°.

Depiction on postage stamps 
The Farewell Spit Lighthouse was featured on a 10-cent postage stamp issued in 1969 in conjunction with the centenary of the New Zealand Government Life Insurance Office.

Gallery

References 

Lighthouses in New Zealand
Lighthouses completed in 1870
Tourist attractions in the Tasman District
Transport buildings and structures in the Tasman District
Tasman District